Schadow is a surname. Notable people with the surname include:

Johann Gottfried Schadow (1764–1850), German sculptor
Rudolph Schadow (1786–1822), German sculptor, son of Johann
Friedrich Wilhelm Schadow (1789–1862), German painter, son of Johann